Douglas Daniel Weight (born January 21, 1971) is an American professional ice hockey coach, executive and former player. He is also the former head coach and assistant general manager for the New York Islanders. During his 19-year National Hockey League career, he played for the New York Rangers, Edmonton Oilers, Carolina Hurricanes, Anaheim Ducks, St. Louis Blues and the New York Islanders.

Playing career
As a youth, Weight played in the 1983 Quebec International Pee-Wee Hockey Tournament with the Detroit Compuware minor ice hockey team.

He graduated in 1989 from Notre Dame High School in Harper Woods, Michigan. He was drafted by the Bloomfield Jets of the North American Junior Hockey League (now known as the NAHL). During that time, high school hockey was not considered to be competitive enough in the Detroit, Michigan area. Weight followed in the footsteps of several other Detroit-area players by playing in the NAJHL, including Pat Lafontaine and Mike Modano. Weight led the NAJHL in scoring, and was recruited by Lake Superior State University.

Weight played two years in the NCAA with LSSU from 1989–91. He was drafted by the New York Rangers in the 1990 NHL Entry Draft with their second pick, 34th overall. After completing his second year with his college team, he played a single playoff game with the Rangers in 1991, then split time between the Rangers and their AHL affiliate the Binghamton Rangers. He played 65 games with the Rangers in his first full NHL season, 1992–93, before being traded to the Edmonton Oilers for forward Esa Tikkanen.

Weight played eight and a half seasons with the Oilers, secluding a stint with SB Rosenheim of the German Elite League (DEL) during the shortened 1994–95 NHL season, serving as their captain from 1999–2001. It was as an Oiler that he earned his reputation as a premiere playmaker, leading Edmonton to five consecutive playoff appearances and scoring a personal-best 104 points during the troubled 1995–96 season. Due to Edmonton's precarious financial situation, Weight was traded  on July 1, 2001, to the St. Louis Blues, along with Michel Riesen, for forwards Marty Reasoner and Jochen Hecht and defenseman Jan Horáček.

Weight spent the next three seasons with the Blues before returning to the DEL, due to the 2004 NHL Lockout, to play in the final stages of the 2004–05 season with the Frankfurt Lions. Upon the resumption of the NHL in the 2005–06 season, Weight returned to the weakened Blues before he was traded after waiving a no-trade clause, along with the rights to Erkki Rajamaki, to the Carolina Hurricanes for Jesse Boulerice, Mike Zigomanis, the rights to Magnus Kahnberg and draft picks on January 30, 2006.

In the 2006 Stanley Cup Finals against his former team the Oilers, Weight and the Hurricanes suffered a huge blow during Game 5, when he was sandwiched heavily along the boards by Raffi Torres and Chris Pronger in the second period of the game, which the Oilers won 4–3 in overtime on June 14, 2006. Weight missed the remainder of the Finals with a shoulder injury. His place in roster went to Erik Cole. The Carolina Hurricanes won the Stanley Cup in 7 games.

Weight then returned to the Blues as a free agent, signing a two-year contract on July 2, 2006. During the 2006–07 season, Weight played his 1,000th game against the Edmonton Oilers on November 17, 2006. With the Blues out of contention for the playoffs for the third season in a row, Weight was again traded to the Anaheim Ducks for center Andy McDonald on December 14, 2007.

On July 2, 2008, Weight was given a one-year contract by the rebuilding New York Islanders. On January 2, 2009, Weight registered his 1,000th point while playing for the Islanders, with an assist on a goal scored by Richard Park. Weight re-signed with the Islanders for the 2009–10 season. For his contributions to the community during the Islanders 2009-10 training camp held in Saskatoon, Saskatchewan, Canada, the baseball diamond at Wallace Park in Saskatoon was named in Weight's honor. He succeeded former longtime Oiler teammate, Bill Guerin, as captain of the Islanders on October 2, 2009. Despite missing a large portion of the season to various injures and scoring 1 goal in 36 games, Weight was signed to a one-year extension with the Islanders on August 31, 2010.

After enduring a second consecutive year decimated by a lingering back injury, Weight announced his retirement following the 2010–11 season on May 26, 2011. With his retirement as a player from the game of hockey after 19 seasons in the NHL, it was immediately announced by the Islanders' general manager, Garth Snow, that Weight would continue on with the organization as an assistant coach and special assistant to the GM. Weight is ranked number 7 out of all American players in points.

Coaching career
Weight became an assistant coach under then-head coach Jack Capuano in the 2011–12 season. On January 17, 2017, the Islanders fired Capuano and promoted Weight to interim coach. On April 12, 2017, Weight was officially named head coach after he led the team to a 24–12–4 record after taking the coaching duties in the middle of the season.

On June 5, 2018, Weight was fired as head coach of the Islanders.

International play
Weight has played several times internationally for his country. He made 3 World Championship appearances for the United States in 1993, 1994 and 2005. He was a part of the silver medal winning team at the 2002 Winter Olympics in Salt Lake City, and also played with Team USA at the 1996 and 2004 World Cup of Hockey, and the 1998 Winter Olympics in Nagano.

In his only junior tournament in the 1991 World Junior Championships, he led the entire tournament in scoring with 5 goals and 14 assists in 7 games for Team USA.

Career statistics

Regular season and playoffs

International

NHL coaching record

Awards and honors

References

External links

Doug Weight-Stars and Stripes In The Great White North
Doug Weight's U.S. Olympic Team bio
Doug Weight's Day With the Stanley Cup

1971 births
Living people
American men's ice hockey centers
Anaheim Ducks players
Binghamton Rangers players
Carolina Hurricanes players
Edmonton Oilers players
Frankfurt Lions players
Ice hockey players at the 1998 Winter Olympics
Ice hockey players at the 2002 Winter Olympics
Ice hockey players at the 2006 Winter Olympics
Ice hockey people from Michigan
King Clancy Memorial Trophy winners
Lake Superior State Lakers men's ice hockey players
Medalists at the 2002 Winter Olympics
New York Islanders coaches
New York Islanders executives
New York Islanders players
New York Rangers draft picks
New York Rangers players
National Hockey League All-Stars
Olympic silver medalists for the United States in ice hockey
Sportspeople from Warren, Michigan
St. Louis Blues players
Stanley Cup champions
Starbulls Rosenheim players
United States Hockey Hall of Fame inductees
AHCA Division I men's ice hockey All-Americans
Ice hockey coaches from Michigan
Ice hockey players from Michigan